Graham Lake, Graham Lakes, or Lake Graham may refer to:

People
 Graham Lake (cricketer) (born 1935), retired British scientist and former English professional cricketer
 Graham Lake, 10th Baronet (1923–2013), one of the Lake baronets

Lakes
 Graham Lake (Maine)
 Graham Lakes (Minnesota)
 Graham Lakes Township, Nobles County, Minnesota
 Lake Graham (Tennessee), site of a regional headquarters of the Tennessee Wildlife Resources Agency
 Lake Graham (Texas), a lake of Texas